Qanqanlu may refer to:
 Qanqanlu, Hamadan
 Qanqanlu, Qazvin